The Shatlyk Gas Field is a natural gas field located in the Mary Province. It was discovered in 1974 and developed by Türkmengaz. It began production in 1980 and produces natural gas and condensates. The total proven reserves of the Shatlyk gas field are around 33 trillion cubic feet (943 km3), and production is slated to be around 287 million cubic feet/day (8.2×105m3) in 2013.

References

Natural gas fields in Turkmenistan
Natural gas fields in the Soviet Union